The 2012–13 Trinidad and Tobago FA Trophy was the 83rd season of the FA Trophy, which is the oldest football competition for teams in Trinidad and Tobago. Caledonia AIA entered as the tournament's defending champion, who defeated Defence Force 1–0 in the 2011–12 final at Manny Ramjohn Stadium. The tournament began on 5 December 2012 with 36 teams competing in single elimination matches and concluded on 1 March 2013 with the crowning of the cup winners.

Qualification
The tournament features teams from the top three levels of the football pyramid. These three levels and 9 leagues, namely the TT Pro League, National Super League, Central FA's Premier Division, Eastern FA's Premier Division, Eastern Counties' Football Union, Northern FA's Premier Division, Southern FA's Premier Division, Tobago FA's Premier Division, and the Secondary School Football League each have their own separate qualification process to trim their ranks down to their final team delegations.

All eight teams from the TT Pro League entered the competition. The top six following the 2012 National Super League season also met qualification. In addition, all six regional football associations were awarded three qualification positions and four teams qualified from the Secondary Schools Football League.

The following clubs qualified for the 83rd edition of the FA Trophy:

Schedule
The schedule for the 2012–13 FA Trophy, as announced by the Trinidad and Tobago Football Association:

Results
All matches were played over two 45 minute halves, and in the process if the match were drawn at the end of regulation time, then two additional 15-minute halves were used, and if necessary, penalty kicks if still drawn after extra time.

First round
The draw for the most prestigious knockout tournament held by the Trinidad and Tobago Football Association was made on 30 November 2012 at its head office in Port of Spain, Trinidad with ties played in the week beginning 3 December 2012. The only Pro League match-up featured W Connection facing North East Stars in the opening match of the FA Trophy. The remaining 28 teams after the random draw were given byes into the second round. North East Stars came from a goal behind in the final eight minutes of the match with W Connection to win 2–1 over their Pro League opponent with goals from Kaydion Gabriel and Elijah Manners. The other teams to advance into the draw for the second round include Point Fortin Civic, La Horquetta SA, and Marabella Family Crisis Centre.

Second round
The draw for the second round took place on 7 December 2012 and involved the four winning teams from the first round and the remaining 28 teams that received byes into the second round. These were from the following levels:

 7 from Level 1 (TT Pro League)
 5 from Level 2 (National Super League)
 17 from Level 3 (Regional Football Association Leagues)
 3 from the Secondary Schools Football League

Matches in the second round were played in the week commencing 10 December 2012. The defending champions, Caledonia AIA, entered the competition in the second round to easily defeat Northern FA's Petit Valley United 8–0 with a second-half hat-trick from Trevin Caesar to advance into the third round draw. Shiva Boys' Hindu College was one of the surprises of the round after the Shiva Boys defeated Eagles United from the National Super League 7–6 on penalties after the match ended in a 3–3 draw. Stokely Vale continued their giant-killing from the 2012 TOYOTA Classic after they won 3–2 over St. Ann's Rangers from the TT Pro League.

Third round
The draw for the third round took place on 14 December 2012 and involved the 16 winning teams from the second round. These were from the following levels:

 6 from Level 1 (TT Pro League)
 3 from Level 2 (National Super League)
 6 from Level 3 (2 CFA Premier Division, 1 EFA Premier Division, 1 Eastern Counties Football Union, 2 SFA Premier Division)
 1 from the Secondary Schools Football League (Shiva Boys' Hindu College)

Matches in the third round will be played in the week commencing 17 December 2012. After having eliminated WASA and Guaya United in the first and second rounds, respectively, Point Fortin Civic knocked off another club from the Super League with a 2–0 win over Joe Public to advance into the quarterfinals. However, the surprise of the round again came from Stokely Vale who picked off their second successive Pro League club when they shocked Defence Force 2–1 at Hasely Crawford Stadium. In the lone all-Pro League encounter, Central FC defeated Police with a 2–1 comeback win using goals from Anthony Wolfe and Darryl Trim to propel The Sharks into the last eight. Caledonia AIA narrowly defeated Joe Public of the Eastern FA Premier Division by a scoreline of 1–0.

Quarterfinals
The draw for the quarterfinals took place on 20 December 2012 and involved the eight winning teams from the third round. The lowest ranked teams left in the competition were Cunupia of the Central FA Premier Division and Point Fortin Civic of the Southern FA Premier Division, both from the third tier of Trinidad and Tobago football, and Shiva Boys' Hindu College of the Secondary Schools Football League. The eight remaining teams were from the following levels:

 4 from Level 1 (TT Pro League)
 1 from Level 2 (Stokely Vale of the National Super League)
 2 from Level 3 (Cunupia of the Central FA Premier Division and Point Fortin Civic of the Southern FA Premier Division)
 1 from the Secondary Schools Football League (Shiva Boys' Hindu College)

Matches in the quarterfinals will be played on 9 January 2013. Central FC eased into the semifinals with a 2–0 win over Shiva Boys with goals from Tyrone Charles and Quincy Charles. The other two quarterfinal matches were decided on penalty kicks with T&TEC and North East Stars respective victors over Point Fortin Civic and Cunupia. The remaining quarterfinal match between Caledonia AIA and Stokely Vale was postponed until 16 January 2013 due to the absence of match officials. The Stallions from Morvant/Laventille came away with a narrow 1–0 victory in Plymouth, Tobago with a 55th-minute goal from Sheldon Holder.

Semifinals
The draw for the semifinals took place at the Trinidad and Tobago Football Association office in Woodbrook on 11 January 2013. The four remaining teams consisted of clubs from the Pro League (1) which included Caledonia AIA, Central FC, North East Stars, and T&TEC. The first semifinal match was contested at Ato Boldon Stadium between Central FC and T&TEC on 16 January 2013. At Hasely Crawford Stadium, Caledonia AIA faced North East Stars in the second semifinal.

In the first semifinal match, Central FC secured a place in the club's first FA Trophy final following a 1–0 win over fellow Pro League club T&TEC at Ato Boldon Stadium. Marvin Oliver grabbed the winner for the Sharks in the 76th minute. In the other semifinal, Caledonia AIA came from a one-goal deficit to defeat North East Stars 2–1 with goals from Sheldon Holder in the 69th minute and ten minutes later from substitute Sherron Joseph.

Final
The final will be contested on 1 March 2013 at a venue to be announced. The match featured Pro League newcomers Central FC, who defeated T&TEC 1–0 in the first semifinal match, and the defending FA Trophy winners Caledonia AIA who defeated North East Stars 2–1 in the second semifinal. Caledonia AIA successfully defended their FA Trophy title with a win over Central FC 2–0 with goals on either side of the half. Keyon Edwards scored the game winner in the 32nd minute for the Stallions of Morvant/Laventille with another goal from Akim Armstrong to secure the win. The leading goal scorer of the tournament was Marcus Joseph of Point Fortin Civic, who ended the competition with seven goals and led his team to an appearance in the quarterfinals.

References

External links
Official Website

Trinidad and Tobago Cup
Trinidad and Tobago Cup
Cup